Eureka Creek is a tributary of Baker Creek in the U.S. state of Alaska. Other Baker tributaries in the vicinity of Eureka Creek include Thanksgiving, Gold Run, and Pioneer creeks with Seattle Junior Creek a tributary of Pioneer.

Geography
Eureka Creek flows southwest along the foot of the Baker-Minook divide. It has a number of small tributaries from the northwest side, but none from the southeast. The other tributaries are rills. Eureka is a small creek carrying barely a sluicehead of water above the mouth of Boston Creek during the ordinary seasons. The creek flows close to the foot of the steeper side.

The gravels of the creek are not very worn, characteristic of weak streams, and have been left for a considerable distance, in places at least , up the slope of the hill as the stream bed has moved to the southeast. The bench gravels are made up entirely of country rocks. The gravel contains a considerable amount of very sticky clay. The clay seems to come from the decomposition of both the grit and the slates.

History
Gold was first discovered on Eureka Creek in February 1899.

References

Bibliography

Rivers of Alaska
Rivers of Yukon–Koyukuk Census Area, Alaska
Rivers of Unorganized Borough, Alaska